Debreše is a village in the municipality of Gostivar, North Macedonia.

History
According to the 1467-68 Ottoman defter, Debreše appears as being largely inhabited by an Orthodox Christian Albanian population. Some families had a mixed Slav-Albanian anthroponomy - usually a Slavic first name and an Albanian last name or last names with Albanian patronyms and Slavic suffixes.

The names are: Mitran, son of Kodra; Rajk-o, his son; Milosh, his son; Dabzhiv, son of Hamza; Gjorgj, son of Goga; Stepan, his brother; Dabzhiv, his son; Dosa, son of Ilije; Lala, his brother; Dona, son of Bud-i; Dimitri, son of Dibrashin; Nen-o, son of Gego; Dimitri, son of Gego; Jovan, son of Gego; Nik-o, son of Miltush; Jovan, his brother; Bojk-o, son of Gjon; Lazor, son of Dobri; Lazor, son of Nikolla; Rajk-o, son of Nikolla; Argjir, son of Rele; Tanush, son of Oliver; Nik-o, son of Lal-ush.

Demographics
As of the 2021 census, Debreše had 2,859 residents with the following ethnic composition:
Albanians 2,683
Persons for whom data are taken from administrative sources 103
Macedonians 59
Others 14

According to the 2002 census, the village had a total of 4847 inhabitants. Ethnic groups in the village include:

Albanians 4739
Macedonians 93
Turks 2 
Bosniaks 1
Romani 156
Others 12

Sports
The local football club KF Flamurtari Debresh plays in the Macedonian Third Football League.

References

External links

Villages in Gostivar Municipality
Albanian communities in North Macedonia